The Cadeby Main Colliery was a coal mine sunk in 1889 in Cadeby, South Yorkshire, England. It commenced production in 1893 and was worked until it was exhausted in 1986.

Cadeby Main pit disaster

On 9 July 1912 there was a major pit disaster at Cadeby Main Colliery. 35 miners died in the first explosion. However a further 53 died in a second explosion which affected the rescue team. 3 more miners died subsequently as a result of their injuries.

References

Coal mines in Yorkshire
Doncaster